2901 may refer to:

 A member of the AMD Am2900 family of logic chips
 The first year of the 30th century